Articles in economics journals are usually classified according to JEL classification codes, which derive from the Journal of Economic Literature.  The JEL is published quarterly by the American Economic Association (AEA) and contains survey articles and information on recently published books and dissertations. The AEA maintains EconLit, a searchable data base of citations for articles, books, reviews, dissertations, and working papers classified by JEL codes for the years from 1969. A recent addition to EconLit is indexing of economics journal articles from 1886 to 1968 parallel to the print series Index of Economic Articles.

Structure
There are 26 primary JEL categories:

JEL Subcategories
Each JEL primary category has secondary and tertiary subcategories, for example, under JEL: D – Microeconomics:
JEL: D1 – Household Behavior and Family Economics
JEL: D11 – Consumer Economics: Theory
JEL code (sub)categories, including periodic updates, are referenced at Journal of Economic Literature (JEL) Classification System.  Links to definitions of (sub)categories are at JEL Classification Codes Guide with corresponding examples of article titles linked to publication information, such as abstracts.

Purpose
Articles in economics journals also list JEL codes (for example JEL: B12), facilitating their use across search engines. Comprehensive uses of JEL (sub)classifications include:
• The New Palgrave Dictionary of Economics, 2008, v. 8, Appendix IV, pp. 854–69, and for the online version by drilling to the primary, secondary, or tertiary JEL code of interest  here and pressing the Search button below it for article-preview links .
• National Bureau of Economic Research Working Papers abstracts by year via links
• Research Papers in Economics via links.

JEL categories

A. General Economics and Teaching

A1 	General Economics
A10 	General
A11 	Role of Economics • Role of Economists • Market for Economists
A12 	Relation of Economics to Other Disciplines
A13 	Relation of Economics to Social Values
A14 	Sociology of Economics
A19 	Other

A2 	Economic Education and Teaching of Economics
A20 	General
A21 	Pre-college
A22 	Undergraduate
A23 	Graduate
A29 	Other

A3 	Collective Works
A30 	General
A31 	Collected Writings of Individuals
A32 	Collective Volumes
A33 	Handbooks
A39 	Other

B. History of Economic Thought, Methodology, and Heterodox Approaches

B00 	General

B1 	History of Economic Thought through 1925
B10 	General
B11 	Preclassical (Ancient, Medieval, Mercantilist, Physiocratic)
B12 	Classical (includes Adam Smith)
B13 	Neoclassical through 1925 (Austrian, Marshallian, Walrasian, Wicksellian)
B14 	Socialist • Marxist
B15 	Historical • Institutional • Evolutionary
B16 	Quantitative and Mathematical
B17 	International Trade and Finance
B19 	Other

B2 	History of Economic Thought since 1925
B20 	General
B21 	Microeconomics
B22 	Macroeconomics
B23 	Econometrics • Quantitative and Mathematical Studies
B24 	Socialist • Marxist • Sraffian
B25 	Historical • Institutional • Evolutionary • Austrian • Stockholm School
B26 	Financial Economics
B27 	International Trade and Finance
B29 	Other

B3 	History of Economic Thought: Individuals
B30 	General
B31 	Individuals
B32 	Obituaries

B4 	Economic Methodology
B40 	General
B41 	Economic Methodology
B49 	Other

B5 	Current Heterodox Approaches
B50 	General
B51 	Socialist • Marxist • Sraffian
B52 	Historical • Institutional • Evolutionary
B53 	Austrian
B54 	Feminist Economics
B59 	Other

C. Mathematical and Quantitative Methods

C00 	General
C01 	Econometrics
C02 	Mathematical Methods

C1 	Econometric and Statistical Methods and Methodology: General
C10 	General
C11 	Bayesian Analysis: General
C12 	Hypothesis Testing: General
C13 	Estimation: General
C14 	Semiparametric and Nonparametric Methods: General
C15 	Statistical Simulation Methods: General
C18 	Methodological Issues: General
C19 	Other

C2 	Single Equation Models • Single Variables
C20 	General
C21   Cross-Sectional Models • Spatial Models • Treatment Effect Models • Quantile Regressions
C22 	Time-Series Models • Dynamic Quantile Regressions • Dynamic Treatment Effect Models • Diffusion Processes
C23 	Panel Data Models • Spatio-temporal Models
C24 	Truncated and Censored Models • Switching Regression Models • Threshold Regression Models
C25 	Discrete Regression and Qualitative Choice Models • Discrete Regressors • Proportions • Probabilities
C26 	Instrumental Variables (IV) Estimation
C29 	Other

C3 	Multiple or Simultaneous Equation Models • Multiple Variables
C30 	General
C31 	Cross-Sectional Models • Spatial Models • Treatment Effect Models • Quantile Regressions • Social Interaction Models
C32 	Time-Series Models • Dynamic Quantile Regressions • Dynamic Treatment Effect Models • Diffusion Processes • State Space Models
C33 	Panel Data Models • Spatio-temporal Models
C34 	Truncated and Censored Models • Switching Regression Models
C35 	Discrete Regression and Qualitative Choice Models • Discrete Regressors • Proportions
C36 	Instrumental Variables (IV) Estimation
C38 	Classification Methods • Cluster Analysis • Principal Components • Factor Models
C39 	Other

C4 	Econometric and Statistical Methods: Special Topics
C40 	General
C41 	Duration Analysis • Optimal Timing Strategies
C43 	Index Numbers and Aggregation
C44 	Operations Research • Statistical Decision Theory
C45 	Neural Networks and Related Topics
C46 	Specific Distributions • Specific Statistics
C49 	Other

C5 	Econometric Modeling
C50 	General
C51 	Model Construction and Estimation
C52 	Model Evaluation, Validation, and Selection
C53 	Forecasting and Prediction Methods • Simulation Methods
C54 	Quantitative Policy Modeling
C55 	Large Data Sets: Modeling and Analysis
C57 	Econometrics of Games and Auctions
C58 	Financial Econometrics
C59 	Other

C6 	Mathematical Methods • Programming Models • Mathematical and Simulation Modeling
C60 	General
C61 	Optimization Techniques • Programming Models • Dynamic Analysis
C62 	Existence and Stability Conditions of Equilibrium
C63 	Computational Techniques • Simulation Modeling
C65 	Miscellaneous Mathematical Tools
C67 	Input–Output Models
C68 	Computable General Equilibrium Models
C69 	Other

C7 	Game Theory and Bargaining Theory
C70 	General
C71 	Cooperative Games
C72 	Noncooperative Games
C73 	Stochastic and Dynamic Games • Evolutionary Games • Repeated Games
C78 	Bargaining Theory • Matching Theory
C79 	Other

C8 	Data Collection and Data Estimation Methodology • Computer Programs
C80 	General
C81 	Methodology for Collecting, Estimating, and Organizing Microeconomic Data • Data Access
C82 	Methodology for Collecting, Estimating, and Organizing Macroeconomic Data • Data Access
C83 	Survey Methods • Sampling Methods
C87 	Econometric Software
C88 	Other Computer Software
C89 	Other

C9 	Design of Experiments
C90 	General
C91 	Laboratory, Individual Behavior
C92 	Laboratory, Group Behavior
C93 	Field Experiments
C99 	Other

D. Microeconomics

D00 	General
D01 	Microeconomic Behavior: Underlying Principles
D02 	Institutions: Design, Formation, Operations, and Impact
D03 	Behavioral Microeconomics: Underlying Principles
D04 	Microeconomic Policy: Formulation, Implementation, and Evaluation

D1 	Household Behavior and Family Economics
D10 	General
D11 	Consumer Economics: Theory
D12 	Consumer Economics: Empirical Analysis
D13 	Household Production and Intrahousehold Allocation 
D14 	Household Saving • Personal Finance
D15	Intertemporal Household Choice • Life Cycle Models and Saving
D16	Collaborative Consumption
D18 	Consumer Protection
D19 	Other

D2 	Production and Organizations
D20 	General
D21 	Firm Behavior: Theory
D22 	Firm Behavior: Empirical Analysis
D23 	Organizational Behavior • Transaction Costs • Property Rights
D24 	Production • Cost • Capital • Capital, Total Factor, and Multifactor Productivity • Capacity
D25	Intertemporal Firm Choice: Investment, Capacity, and Financing
D29 	Other

D3 	Distribution
D30 	General
D31 	Personal Income, Wealth, and Their Distributions
D33 	Factor Income Distribution
D39 	Other

D4 	Market Structure, Pricing, and Design
D40 	General
D41 	Perfect Competition
D42 	Monopoly
D43 	Oligopoly and Other Forms of Market Imperfection
D44 	Auctions
D45 	Rationing • Licensing
D46 	Value Theory
D47 	Market Design
D49 	Other

D5 	General Equilibrium and Disequilibrium
D50 	General
D51 	Exchange and Production Economies
D52 	Incomplete Markets
D53 	Financial Markets
D57 	Input–Output Tables and Analysis
D58 	Computable and Other Applied General Equilibrium Models
D59 	Other

D6 	Welfare Economics
D60 	General
D61 	Allocative Efficiency • Cost–Benefit Analysis
D62 	Externalities
D63 	Equity, Justice, Inequality, and Other Normative Criteria and Measurement
D64 	Altruism • Philanthropy • Intergenerational Transfers
D69 	Other

D7 	Analysis of Collective Decision-Making
D70 	General
D71 	Social Choice • Clubs • Committees • Associations
D72 	Political Processes: Rent-Seeking, Lobbying, Elections, Legislatures, and Voting Behavior
D73 	Bureaucracy • Administrative Processes in Public Organizations • Corruption
D74 	Conflict • Conflict Resolution • Alliances • Revolutions
D78 	Positive Analysis of Policy Formulation and Implementation
D79 	Other

D8 	Information, Knowledge, and Uncertainty
D80 	General
D81 	Criteria for Decision-Making under Risk and Uncertainty
D82 	Asymmetric and Private Information • Mechanism Design
D83 	Search • Learning • Information and Knowledge • Communication • Belief • Unawareness
D84 	Expectations • Speculations
D85 	Network Formation and Analysis: Theory
D86 	Economics of Contract: Theory
D87 	Neuroeconomics
D89 	Other

D9 	Micro-Based Behavioral Economics
D90 	General
D91	Role and Effects of Psychological, Emotional, Social, and Cognitive Factors on Decision Making
D99 	Other

E. Macroeconomics and Monetary Economics

E00 	General
E01 	Measurement and Data on National Income and Product Accounts and Wealth • Environmental Accounts
E02 	Institutions and the Macroeconomy
E03 	Behavioral Macroeconomics

E1 	General Aggregative Models
E10 	General
E11 	Marxian • Sraffian • Kaleckian
E12 	Keynes • Keynesian • Post-Keynesian
E13 	Neoclassical
E14 	Austrian • Evolutionary • Institutional
E16 	Social Accounting Matrix
E17 	Forecasting and Simulation: Models and Applications
E19 	Other

E2 	Consumption, Saving, Production, Investment, Labor Markets, and Informal Economy
E20 	General
E21 	Consumption • Saving • Wealth
E22 	Investment • Capital • Intangible Capital • Capacity
E23 	Production
E24 	Employment • Unemployment • Wages • Intergenerational Income Distribution • Aggregate Human Capital • Aggregate Labor Productivity
E25 	Aggregate Factor Income Distribution
E26 	Informal Economy • Underground Economy
E27 	Forecasting and Simulation: Models and Applications
E29 	Other

E3 	Prices, Business Fluctuations, and Cycles
E30 	General
E31 	Price Level • Inflation • Deflation
E32 	Business Fluctuations • Cycles
E37 	Forecasting and Simulation: Models and Applications
E39 	Other

E4 	Money and Interest Rates
E40 	General
E41 	Demand for Money
E42 	Monetary Systems • Standards • Regimes • Government and the Monetary System • Payment Systems
E43 	Interest Rates: Determination, Term Structure, and Effects
E44 	Financial Markets and the Macroeconomy
E47 	Forecasting and Simulation: Models and Applications
E49 	Other

E5 	Monetary Policy, Central Banking, and the Supply of Money and Credit
E50 	General
E51 	Money Supply • Credit • Money Multipliers
E52 	Monetary Policy
E58 	Central Banks and Their Policies
E59 	Other

E6 	Macroeconomic Policy, Macroeconomic Aspects of Public Finance, and General Outlook
E60 	General
E61 	Policy Objectives • Policy Designs and Consistency • Policy Coordination
E62 	Fiscal Policy
E63 	Comparative or Joint Analysis of Fiscal and Monetary Policy • Stabilization • Treasury Policy
E64 	Incomes Policy • Price Policy
E65 	Studies of Particular Policy Episodes
E66 	General Outlook and Conditions
E69 	Other

F. International Economics

F00 	General
F01 	Global Outlook
F02 	International Economic Order and Integration

F1 	Trade
F10 	General
F11 	Neoclassical Models of Trade
F12 	Models of Trade with Imperfect Competition and Scale Economies • Fragmentation
F13 	Trade Policy • International Trade Organizations
F14 	Empirical Studies of Trade
F15 	Economic Integration
F16 	Trade and Labor Market Interactions
F17 	Trade Forecasting and Simulation
F18 	Trade and Environment
F19 	Other

F2 	International Factor Movements and International Business
F20 	General
F21 	International Investment • Long-Term Capital Movements
F22 	International Migration
F23 	Multinational Firms • International Business
F24 	Remittances
F29 	Other

F3 	International Finance
F30 	General
F31 	Foreign Exchange
F32 	Current Account Adjustment • Short-Term Capital Movements
F33 	International Monetary Arrangements and Institutions
F34 	International Lending and Debt Problems
F35 	Foreign Aid
F36 	Financial Aspects of Economic Integration
F37 	International Finance Forecasting and Simulation: Models and Applications
F38 	International Financial Policy: Financial Transactions Tax; Capital Controls
F39 	Other

F4 	Macroeconomic Aspects of International Trade and Finance
F40 	General
F41 	Open Economy Macroeconomics
F42 	International Policy Coordination and Transmission
F43 	Economic Growth of Open Economies
F44 	International Business Cycles
F45 	Macroeconomic Issues of Monetary Unions
F47 	Forecasting and Simulation: Models and Applications
F49 	Other

F5 	International Relations, National Security, and International Political Economy
F50 	General
F51 	International Conflicts • Negotiations • Sanctions
F52 	National Security • Economic Nationalism
F53 	International Agreements and Observance • International Organizations
F54 	Colonialism • Imperialism • Postcolonialism
F55 	International Institutional Arrangements
F59 	Other

F6 	Economic Impacts of Globalization
F60 	General
F61 	Microeconomic Impacts
F62 	Macroeconomic Impacts
F63 	Economic Development
F64 	Environment
F65 	Finance
F66 	Labor
F68 	Policy
F69 	Other

G. Financial Economics

G00 	General
G01 	Financial Crises
G02 	Behavioral Finance: Underlying Principles

G1 	General Financial Markets
G10 	General
G11 	Portfolio Choice • Investment Decisions
G12 	Asset Pricing • Trading Volume • Bond Interest Rates
G13 	Contingent Pricing • Futures Pricing
G14 	Information and Market Efficiency • Event Studies • Insider Trading
G15 	International Financial Markets
G17 	Financial Forecasting and Simulation
G18 	Government Policy and Regulation
G19 	Other

G2 	Financial Institutions and Services
G20 	General
G21 	Banks • Depository Institutions • Micro Finance Institutions • Mortgages
G22 	Insurance • Insurance Companies • Actuarial Studies
G23 	Non-bank Financial Institutions • Financial Instruments • Institutional Investors
G24 	Investment Banking • Venture Capital • Brokerage • Ratings and Ratings Agencies
G28 	Government Policy and Regulation
G29 	Other

G3 	Corporate Finance and Governance
G30 	General
G31 	Capital Budgeting • Fixed Investment and Inventory Studies • Capacity
G32 	Financing Policy • Financial Risk and Risk Management • Capital and Ownership Structure • Value of Firms • Goodwill
G33 	Bankruptcy • Liquidation
G34 	Mergers • Acquisitions • Restructuring • Corporate Governance
G35 	Payout Policy
G38 	Government Policy and Regulation
G39 	Other

H. Public Economics

H00 	General

H1 	Structure and Scope of Government
H10 	General
H11 	Structure, Scope, and Performance of Government
H12 	Crisis Management
H13 	Economics of Eminent Domain • Expropriation • Nationalization
H19 	Other

H2 	Taxation, Subsidies, and Revenue
H20 	General
H21 	Efficiency • Optimal Taxation
H22 	Incidence
H23 	Externalities • Redistributive Effects • Environmental Taxes and Subsidies
H24 	Personal Income and Other Nonbusiness Taxes and Subsidies
H25 	Business Taxes and Subsidies
H26 	Tax Evasion and Avoidance
H27 	Other Sources of Revenue
H29 	Other

H3 	Fiscal Policies and Behavior of Economic Agents
H30 	General
H31 	Household
H32 	Firm
H39 	Other

H4 	Publicly Provided Goods
H40 	General
H41 	Public Goods
H42 	Publicly Provided Private Goods
H43 	Project Evaluation • Social Discount Rate
H44 	Publicly Provided Goods: Mixed Markets
H49 	Other

H5 	National Government Expenditures and Related Policies
H50 	General
H51 	Government Expenditures and Health
H52 	Government Expenditures and Education
H53 	Government Expenditures and Welfare Programs
H54 	Infrastructures • Other Public Investment and Capital Stock
H55 	Social Security and Public Pensions
H56 	National Security and War
H57 	Procurement
H59 	Other

H6 	National Budget, Deficit, and Debt
H60 	General
H61 	Budget • Budget Systems
H62 	Deficit • Surplus
H63 	Debt • Debt Management • Sovereign Debt
H68 	Forecasts of Budgets, Deficits, and Debt
H69 	Other

H7 	State and Local Government • Intergovernmental Relations
H70 	General
H71 	State and Local Taxation, Subsidies, and Revenue
H72 	State and Local Budget and Expenditures
H73 	Interjurisdictional Differentials and Their Effects
H74 	State and Local Borrowing
H75 	State and Local Government: Health • Education • Welfare • Public Pensions
H76 	State and Local Government: Other Expenditure Categories
H77 	Intergovernmental Relations • Federalism • Secession
H79 	Other

H8 	Miscellaneous Issues
H80 	General
H81 	Governmental Loans • Loan Guarantees • Credits • Grants • Bailouts
H82 	Governmental Property
H83 	Public Administration • Public Sector Accounting and Audits
H84 	Disaster Aid
H87 	International Fiscal Issues • International Public Goods
H89 	Other

I. Health, Education, and Welfare

I00 	General

I1 	Health
I10 	General
I11 	Analysis of Health Care Markets
I12 	Health Behavior
I13 	Health Insurance, Public and Private
I14 	Health and Inequality
I15 	Health and Economic Development
I18 	Government Policy • Regulation • Public Health
I19 	Other

I2 	Education and Research Institutions
I20 	General
I21 	Analysis of Education
I22 	Educational Finance • Financial Aid
I23 	Higher Education • Research Institutions
I24 	Education and Inequality
I25 	Education and Economic Development
I26 	Returns to Education
I28 	Government Policy
I29 	Other

I3 	Welfare, Well-Being, and Poverty
I30 	General
I31 	General Welfare, Well-Being
I32 	Measurement and Analysis of Poverty
I38 	Government Policy • Provision and Effects of Welfare Programs
I39 	Other

J.  Labor and  Demographic Economics
J00 	General
J01 	Labor Economics: General
J08 	Labor Economics: Policies

J1 	Demographic Economics
J10 	General
J11 	Demographic Trends, Macroeconomic Effects, and Forecasts
J12 	Marriage • Marital Dissolution • Family Structure • Domestic Abuse
J13 	Fertility • Family Planning • Child Care • Children • Youth
J14 	Economics of the Elderly • Economics of the Handicapped • Non-Labor Market Discrimination
J15 	Economics of Minorities, Races, Indigenous Peoples, and Immigrants • Non-labor Discrimination
J16 	Economics of Gender • Non-labor Discrimination
J17 	Value of Life • Forgone Income
J18 	Public Policy
J19 	Other

J2 	Demand and Supply of Labor
J20 	General
J21 	Labor Force and Employment, Size, and Structure
J22 	Time Allocation and Labor Supply
J23 	Labor Demand
J24 	Human Capital • Skills • Occupational Choice • Labor Productivity
J26 	Retirement • Retirement Policies
J28 	Safety • Job Satisfaction • Related Public Policy
J29 	Other

J3 	Wages, Compensation, and Labor Costs
J30 	General
J31 	Wage Level and Structure • Wage Differentials
J32 	Nonwage Labor Costs and Benefits • Retirement Plans • Private Pensions
J33 	Compensation Packages • Payment Methods
J38 	Public Policy
J39 	Other

J4 	Particular Labor Markets
J40 	General
J41 	Labor Contracts
J42 	Monopsony • Segmented Labor Markets
J43 	Agricultural Labor Markets
J44 	Professional Labor Markets • Occupational Licensing
J45 	Public Sector Labor Markets
J46 	Informal Labor Markets
J47 	Coercive Labor Markets
J48 	Public Policy
J49 	Other

J5 	Labor–Management Relations, Trade Unions, and Collective Bargaining
J50 	General
J51 	Trade Unions: Objectives, Structure, and Effects
J52 	Dispute Resolution: Strikes, Arbitration, and Mediation • Collective Bargaining
J53 	Labor–Management Relations • Industrial Jurisprudence
J54 	Producer Cooperatives • Labor Managed Firms • Employee Ownership
J58 	Public Policy
J59 	Other

J6 	Mobility, Unemployment, Vacancies, and Immigrant Workers
J60 	General
J61 	Geographic Labor Mobility • Immigrant Workers
J62 	Job, Occupational, and Intergenerational Mobility
J63 	Turnover • Vacancies • Layoffs
J64 	Unemployment: Models, Duration, Incidence, and Job Search
J65 	Unemployment Insurance • Severance Pay • Plant Closings
J68 	Public Policy
J69 	Other

J7 	Labor Discrimination
J70 	General
J71 	Discrimination
J78 	Public Policy
J79 	Other

J8 	Labor Standards: National and International
J80 	General
J81 	Working Conditions
J82 	Labor Force Composition
J83 	Workers' Rights
J88 	Public Policy
J89 	Other

K. Law and Economics

K00 	General

K1 	Basic Areas of Law
K10 	General
K11 	Property Law
K12 	Contract Law
K13 	Tort Law and Product Liability • Forensic Economics
K14 	Criminal Law
K15 	Civil Law • Common Law
K16 	Election Law
K19 	Other

K2 	Regulation and Business Law
K20 	General
K21 	Antitrust Law
K22 	Business and Securities Law
K23 	Regulated Industries and Administrative Law
K24 	Cyber Law
K25 	Real Estate Law
K29 	Other

K3 	Other Substantive Areas of Law
K30 	General
K31 	Labor Law
K32 	Energy, Environmental, Health, and Safety Law
K33 	International Law
K34 	Tax Law
K35 	Personal Bankruptcy Law
K36 	Family and Personal Law
K37 	Immigration Law
K38 	Human Rights Law • Gender Law
K39 	Other

K4 	Legal Procedure, the Legal System, and Illegal Behavior
K40 	General
K41 	Litigation Process
K42 	Illegal Behavior and the Enforcement of Law
K49 	Other

L. Industrial Organization

L00 	General

L1 	Market Structure, Firm Strategy, and Market Performance
L10 	General
L11 	Production, Pricing, and Market Structure • Size Distribution of Firms
L12 	Monopoly • Monopolization Strategies
L13 	Oligopoly and Other Imperfect Markets
L14 	Transactional Relationships • Contracts and Reputation • Networks
L15 	Information and Product Quality • Standardization and Compatibility
L16 	Industrial Organization and Macroeconomics: Industrial Structure and Structural Change • Industrial Price Indices
L17 	Open Source Products and Markets
L19 	Other

L2 	Firm Objectives, Organization, and Behavior
L20 	General
L21 	Business Objectives of the Firm
L22 	Firm Organization and Market Structure
L23 	Organization of Production
L24 	Contracting Out • Joint Ventures • Technology Licensing
L25 	Firm Performance: Size, Diversification, and Scope
L26 	Entrepreneurship
L29 	Other

L3 	Nonprofit Organizations and Public Enterprise
L30 	General
L31 	Nonprofit Institutions • NGOs • Social Entrepreneurship
L32 	Public Enterprises • Public-Private Enterprises
L33 	Comparison of Public and Private Enterprises and Nonprofit Institutions • Privatization • Contracting Out
L38 	Public Policy
L39 	Other

L4 	Antitrust Issues and Policies
L40 	General
L41 	Monopolization • Horizontal Anticompetitive Practices
L42 	Vertical Restraints • Resale Price Maintenance • Quantity Discounts
L43 	Legal Monopolies and Regulation or Deregulation
L44 	Antitrust Policy and Public Enterprises, Nonprofit Institutions, and Professional Organizations
L49 	Other

L5 	Regulation and Industrial Policy
L50 	General
L51 	Economics of Regulation
L52 	Industrial Policy • Sectoral Planning Methods
L53 	Enterprise Policy
L59 	Other

L6 	Industry Studies: Manufacturing
L60 	General
L61 	Metals and Metal Products • Cement • Glass • Ceramics
L62 	Automobiles • Other Transportation Equipment • Related Parts and Equipment
L63 	Microelectronics • Computers • Communications Equipment
L64 	Other Machinery • Business Equipment • Armaments
L65 	Chemicals • Rubber • Drugs • Biotechnology • Plastics
L66 	Food • Beverages • Cosmetics • Tobacco • Wine and Spirits
L67 	Other Consumer Nondurables: Clothing, Textiles, Shoes, and Leather Goods; Household Goods; Sports Equipment
L68 	Appliances • Furniture • Other Consumer Durables
L69 	Other

L7 	Industry Studies: Primary Products and Construction
L70 	General
L71 	Mining, Extraction, and Refining: Hydrocarbon Fuels
L72 	Mining, Extraction, and Refining: Other Nonrenewable Resources
L73 	Forest Products
L74 	Construction
L78 	Government Policy
L79 	Other

L8 	Industry Studies: Services
L80 	General
L81 	Retail and Wholesale Trade • e-Commerce
L82 	Entertainment • Media
L83 	Sports • Gambling • Restaurants • Recreation • Tourism
L84 	Personal, Professional, and Business Services
L85 	Real Estate Services
L86 	Information and Internet Services • Computer Software
L87 	Postal and Delivery Services
L88 	Government Policy
L89 	Other

L9 	Industry Studies: Transportation and Utilities
L90 	General
L91 	Transportation: General
L92 	Railroads and Other Surface Transportation
L93 	Air Transportation
L94 	Electric Utilities
L95 	Gas Utilities • Pipelines • Water Utilities
L96 	Telecommunications
L97 	Utilities: General
L98 	Government Policy
L99 	Other

M. Business Administration and Business Economics • Marketing • Accounting • Personnel Economics

M00 	General

M1 	Business Administration
M10 	General
M11 	Production Management
M12 	Personnel Management • Executives; Executive Compensation
M13 	New Firms • Startups
M14 	Corporate Culture • Diversity • Social Responsibility
M15 	IT Management
M16 	International Business Administration
M19 	Other

M2 	Business Economics
M20 	General
M21 	Business Economics
M29 	Other

M3 	Marketing and Advertising
M30 	General
M31 	Marketing
M37 	Advertising
M38 	Government Policy and Regulation
M39 	Other

M4 	Accounting and Auditing
M40 	General
M41 	Accounting
M42 	Auditing
M48 	Government Policy and Regulation
M49 	Other

M5 	Personnel Economics
M50 	General
M51 	Firm Employment Decisions • Promotions
M52 	Compensation and Compensation Methods and Their Effects
M53 	Training
M54 	Labor Management
M55 	Labor Contracting Devices
M59 	Other

N. Economic History

N00 	General
N01 	Development of the Discipline: Historiographical; Sources and Methods

N1 	Macroeconomics and Monetary Economics • Industrial Structure • Growth • Fluctuations
N10 	General, International, or Comparative
N11 	U.S. • Canada: Pre-1913
N12 	U.S. • Canada: 1913–
N13 	Europe: Pre-1913
N14 	Europe: 1913–
N15 	Asia including Middle East
N16 	Latin America • Caribbean
N17 	Africa • Oceania

N2 	Financial Markets and Institutions
N20 	General, International, or Comparative
N21 	U.S. • Canada: Pre-1913
N22 	U.S. • Canada: 1913–
N23 	Europe: Pre-1913
N24 	Europe: 1913–
N25 	Asia including Middle East
N26 	Latin America • Caribbean
N27 	Africa • Oceania

N3 	Labor and Consumers, Demography, Education, Health, Welfare, Income, Wealth, Religion, and Philanthropy
N30 	General, International, or Comparative
N31 	U.S. • Canada: Pre-1913
N32 	U.S. • Canada: 1913-
N33 	Europe: Pre-1913
N34 	Europe: 1913-
N35 	Asia including Middle East
N36 	Latin America • Caribbean
N37 	Africa • Oceania

N4 	Government, War, Law, International Relations, and Regulation
N40 	General, International, or Comparative
N41 	U.S. • Canada: Pre-1913
N42 	U.S. • Canada: 1913–
N43 	Europe: Pre-1913
N44 	Europe: 1913–
N45 	Asia including Middle East
N46 	Latin America • Caribbean
N47 	Africa • Oceania

N5 	Agriculture, Natural Resources, Environment, and Extractive Industries
N50 	General, International, or Comparative
N51 	U.S. • Canada: Pre-1913
N52 	U.S. • Canada: 1913–
N53 	Europe: Pre-1913
N54 	Europe: 1913–
N55 	Asia including Middle East
N56 	Latin America • Caribbean
N57 	Africa • Oceania

N6 	Manufacturing and Construction
N60 	General, International, or Comparative
N61 	U.S. • Canada: Pre-1913
N62 	U.S. • Canada: 1913–
N63 	Europe: Pre-1913
N64 	Europe: 1913–
N65 	Asia including Middle East
N66 	Latin America • Caribbean
N67 	Africa • Oceania

N7 	Transport, Trade, Energy, Technology, and Other Services
N70 	General, International, or Comparative
N71 	U.S. • Canada: Pre-1913
N72 	U.S. • Canada: 1913–
N73 	Europe: Pre-1913
N74 	Europe: 1913–
N75 	Asia including Middle East
N76 	Latin America • Caribbean
N77 	Africa • Oceania

N8 	Micro-Business History
N80 	General, International, or Comparative
N81 	U.S. • Canada: Pre-1913
N82 	U.S. • Canada: 1913–
N83 	Europe: Pre-1913
N84 	Europe: 1913–
N85 	Asia including Middle East
N86 	Latin America • Caribbean
N87 	Africa • Oceania

N9 	Regional and Urban History
N90 	General, International, or Comparative
N91 	U.S. • Canada: Pre-1913
N92 	U.S. • Canada: 1913–
N93 	Europe: Pre-1913
N94 	Europe: 1913–
N95 	Asia including Middle East
N96 	Latin America • Caribbean
N97 	Africa • Oceania

O. Economic Development, Innovation, Technological Change, and Growth

O1 	Economic Development
O10 	General
O11 	Macroeconomic Analyses of Economic Development
O12 	Microeconomic Analyses of Economic Development
O13 	Agriculture • Natural Resources • Energy • Environment • Other Primary Products
O14 	Industrialization • Manufacturing and Service Industries • Choice of Technology
O15 	Human Resources • Human Development • Income Distribution • Migration
O16 	Financial Markets • Saving and Capital Investment • Corporate Finance and Governance
O17 	Formal and Informal Sectors • Shadow Economy • Institutional Arrangements
O18 	Urban, Rural, Regional, and Transportation Analysis • Housing • Infrastructure
O19 	International Linkages to Development • Role of International Organizations

O2 	Development Planning and Policy
O20 	General
O21 	Planning Models • Planning Policy
O22 	Project Analysis
O23 	Fiscal and Monetary Policy in Development
O24 	Trade Policy • Factor Movement Policy • Foreign Exchange Policy
O25 	Industrial Policy
O29 	Other

O3 	Innovation • Research and Development • Technological Change • Intellectual Property Rights
O30 	General
O31 	Innovation and Invention: Processes and Incentives
O32 	Management of Technological Innovation and R&D
O33 	Technological Change: Choices and Consequences • Diffusion Processes
O34 	Intellectual Property and Intellectual Capital
O35 	Social Innovation
O38 	Government Policy
O39 	Other

O4 	Economic Growth and Aggregate Productivity
O40 	General
O41 	One, Two, and Multisector Growth Models
O42 	Monetary Growth Models
O43 	Institutions and Growth
O44 	Environment and Growth
O47 	Empirical Studies of Economic Growth • Aggregate Productivity • Cross-Country Output Convergence
O49 	Other

O5 	Economywide Country Studies
O50 	General
O51 	U.S. • Canada
O52 	Europe
O53 	Asia including Middle East
O54 	Latin America • Caribbean
O55 	Africa
O56 	Oceania
O57 	Comparative Studies of Countries

P. Economic Systems

P00 	General

P1 	Capitalist Systems
P10 	General
P11 	Planning, Coordination, and Reform
P12 	Capitalist Enterprises
P13 	Cooperative Enterprises
P14 	Property Rights
P16 	Political Economy
P17 	Performance and Prospects
P18 	Energy • Environment
P19 	Other

P2 	Socialist Systems and Transitional Economies
P20 	General
P21 	Planning, Coordination, and Reform
P22 	Prices
P23 	Factor and Product Markets • Industry Studies • Population
P24 	National Income, Product, and Expenditure • Money • Inflation
P25 	Urban, Rural, and Regional Economics
P26 	Political Economy • Property Rights
P27 	Performance and Prospects
P28 	Natural Resources • Energy • Environment
P29 	Other

P3 	Socialist Institutions and Their Transitions
P30 	General
P31 	Socialist Enterprises and Their Transitions
P32 	Collectives • Communes • Agriculture
P33 	International Trade, Finance, Investment, Relations, and Aid
P34 	Financial Economics
P35 	Public Economics
P36 	Consumer Economics • Health • Education and Training • Welfare, Income, Wealth, and Poverty
P37 	Legal Institutions • Illegal Behavior
P39 	Other

P4 	Other Economic Systems
P40 	General
P41 	Planning, Coordination, and Reform
P42 	Productive Enterprises • Factor and Product Markets • Prices • Population
P43 	Public Economics • Financial Economics
P44 	National Income, Product, and Expenditure • Money • Inflation
P45 	International Trade, Finance, Investment, and Aid
P46 	Consumer Economics • Health • Education and Training • Welfare, Income, Wealth, and Poverty
P47 	Performance and Prospects
P48 	Political Economy • Legal Institutions • Property Rights • Natural Resources • Energy • Environment • Regional Studies
P49 	Other

P5 	 Comparative Economic Systems
P50 	General
P51 	Comparative Analysis of Economic Systems
P52 	Comparative Studies of Particular Economies
P59 	Other

Q. Agricultural and Natural Resource Economics • Environmental and Ecological Economics

Q00 	General
Q01 	Sustainable Development
Q02 	Commodity Markets

Q1 	Agriculture
Q10 	General
Q11 	Aggregate Supply and Demand Analysis • Prices
Q12 	Micro Analysis of Farm Firms, Farm Households, and Farm Input Markets
Q13 	Agricultural Markets and Marketing • Cooperatives • Agribusiness
Q14 	Agricultural Finance
Q15 	Land Ownership and Tenure • Land Reform • Land Use • Irrigation • Agriculture and Environment
Q16 	R&D • Agricultural Technology • Biofuels • Agricultural Extension Services
Q17 	Agriculture in International Trade
Q18 	Agricultural Policy • Food Policy
Q19 	Other

Q2 	Renewable Resources and Conservation
Q20 	General
Q21 	Demand and Supply • Prices
Q22 	Fishery • Aquaculture
Q23 	Forestry
Q24 	Land
Q25 	Water
Q26 	Recreational Aspects of Natural Resources
Q27 	Issues in International Trade
Q28 	Government Policy
Q29 	Other

Q3 	Nonrenewable Resources and Conservation
Q30 	General
Q31 	Demand and Supply • Prices
Q32 	Exhaustible Resources and Economic Development
Q33 	Resource Booms
Q34 	Natural Resources and Domestic and International Conflicts
Q35 	Hydrocarbon Resources
Q37 	Issues in International Trade
Q38 	Government Policy
Q39 	Other

Q4 	Energy
Q40 	General
Q41 	Demand and Supply • Prices
Q42 	Alternative Energy Sources
Q43 	Energy and the Macroeconomy
Q47 	Energy Forecasting
Q48 	Government Policy
Q49 	Other

Q5 	Environmental Economics
Q50 	General
Q51 	Valuation of Environmental Effects
Q52 	Pollution Control Adoption and Costs • Distributional Effects • Employment Effects
Q53 	Air Pollution • Water Pollution • Noise • Hazardous Waste • Solid Waste • Recycling
Q54 	Climate • Natural Disasters and Their Management • Global Warming
Q55 	Technological Innovation
Q56 	Environment and Development • Environment and Trade • Sustainability • Environmental Accounts and Accounting • Environmental Equity • Population Growth
Q57 	Ecological Economics: Ecosystem Services • Biodiversity Conservation • Bioeconomics • Industrial Ecology
Q58 	Government Policy
Q59 	Other

R. Urban, Rural, Regional, Real Estate, and Transportation Economics

R00 	General

R1 	General Regional Economics
R10 	General
R11 	Regional Economic Activity: Growth, Development, Environmental Issues, and Changes
R12 	Size and Spatial Distributions of Regional Economic Activity
R13 	General Equilibrium and Welfare Economic Analysis of Regional Economies
R14 	Land Use Patterns
R15 	Econometric and Input–Output Models • Other Models
R19 	Other

R2 	Household Analysis
R20 	General
R21 	Housing Demand
R22 	Other Demand
R23 	Regional Migration • Regional Labor Markets • Population • Neighborhood Characteristics
R28 	Government Policy
R29 	Other

R3 	Real Estate Markets, Spatial Production Analysis, and Firm Location
R30 	General
R31 	Housing Supply and Markets
R32 	Other Spatial Production and Pricing Analysis
R33 	Nonagricultural and Nonresidential Real Estate Markets
R38 	Government Policy
R39 	Other

R4 	Transportation Economics
R40 	General
R41 	Transportation: Demand, Supply, and Congestion • Travel Time • Safety and Accidents • Transportation Noise
R42 	Government and Private Investment Analysis • Road Maintenance • Transportation Planning
R48 	Government Pricing and Policy
R49 	Other

R5 	Regional Government Analysis
R50 	General
R51 	Finance in Urban and Rural Economies
R52 	Land Use and Other Regulations
R53 	Public Facility Location Analysis • Public Investment and Capital Stock
R58 	Regional Development Planning and Policy
R59 	Other

Y. Miscellaneous Categories

Y1 	Data: Tables and Charts
Y10 	Data: Tables and Charts

Y2 	Introductory Material
Y20 	Introductory Material

Y3 	Book Reviews (unclassified)
Y30 	Book Reviews (unclassified)

Y4 	Dissertations (unclassified)
Y40 	Dissertations (unclassified)

Y5 	Further Reading (unclassified)
Y50 	Further Reading (unclassified)

Y6 	Excerpts
Y60 	Excerpts

Y7 	No Author General Discussions
Y70 	No Author General Discussions

Y8 	Related Disciplines
Y80 	Related Disciplines

Y9 	Other
Y90 	Other
Y91 	Pictures and Maps
Y92 	Novels, Self-Help Books, etc.

Z. Other Special Topics

Z00 	General

Z1 	Cultural Economics • Economic Sociology • Economic Anthropology
Z10 	General
Z11 	Economics of the Arts and Literature
Z12 	Religion
Z13 	Economic Sociology • Economic Anthropology • Language • Social and Economic Stratification 
Z18 	Public Policy
Z19 	Other

Z2 	Sports Economics
Z20 	General
Z21 	Industry Studies
Z22 	Labor Issues
Z23 	Finance
Z28 	Policy
Z29 	Other

Z3 	Tourism Economics
Z30 	General
Z31 	Industry Studies
Z32 	Tourism and Development
Z33 	Marketing and Finance
Z38 	Policy
Z39 	Other

Notes
 JEL codes A through Z denote primary categories (e.g. D Microeconomics). Secondary categories are specified by an additional Arabic numeral (e.g. D3 Distribution), tertiary categories by a following second Arabic numeral (e.g. D30 General). Articles in economics publications use JEL codes in this manner: JEL: B12.
 Developed in the context of the Journal of Economic Literature, the JEL classification system became a standard method of classifying economics literature, including journal articles, books, collective volume articles, dissertations, working papers in economics, book reviews from the Journal of Economic Literature, and EconLit.

References

External links
 Full list of JEL classifications
 JEL Classification Codes Guide, a more detailed explanation of the classification system

Library cataloging and classification
Economics journals
Economics profession and organizations
Economics lists